Petr Vlk (born 7 January 1964) is a former Czech professional ice hockey player. He competed in the men's tournament at the 1988 Winter Olympics.

Career statistics

Regular season and playoffs

International

References

External links

1964 births
Czech ice hockey right wingers
Czechoslovak expatriate sportspeople in Switzerland
Olympic ice hockey players of Czechoslovakia
HC Dukla Jihlava players
Ice hockey players at the 1988 Winter Olympics
Living people
New York Islanders draft picks
Sportspeople from Havlíčkův Brod
SC Herisau players
HKM Zvolen players
Expatriate ice hockey players in Switzerland
Czechoslovak expatriate ice hockey people
Czechoslovak ice hockey right wingers